Badminton was one of two demonstration sports at the 1972 Summer Olympics in Munich.  It was the first time that the sport was part of the Olympic program, and it would become an official Olympic sport 20 years later at the 1992 Summer Olympics.

Medallists

Medal table

Event results
25 participants from 11 countries took part in four events. Several entries in the doubles events were mixed teams of players from different nations, a practice not allowed in official medal events at the Olympic Games since 1904.  All competition took place on September 4.

Men's singles

Men's doubles

Women's singles

Mixed doubles

References
 
 

1972 Summer Olympics events
1972
Olympics
Badminton tournaments in Germany
Men's events at the 1972 Summer Olympics
Women's events at the 1972 Summer Olympics
Olympic demonstration sports